is a Japanese manga series written by Kyou Shirodaira and illustrated by Eita Mizuno. It was published by Enix and then Square Enix in Monthly Shōnen Gangan from 1999 to 2005 and collected in 15 bound volumes. The series focuses on Ayumu Narumi and his efforts to solve the mystery of the Blade Children, cursed geniuses with cat-like eyes lacking a seventh rib bone. A prequel series by Shirodaira and Mizuno, called Spiral: Alive, was published in Gangan Wing and Monthly Shōnen Gangan from April 2004 to June 2008 and collected in five bound volumes.

Spiral: The Bonds of Reasoning was originally licensed for an English language release in North America by Tokyopop, however the company dropped the series. Yen Press acquired the license for Northern American release, and published the first volume in October 2007.

The series was adapted as a twenty-five episode anime television series broadcast on TV Tokyo from October 1, 2002 until March 25, 2003. The anime is licensed in Region 1 by Funimation, who released it on DVD and broadcast it on the Funimation Channel, along with the programming block on Colours TV in 2006. The series was also adapted as four light novels and a series of CD dramas.

Plot

Spiral: The Bonds of Reasoning 
About two years ago, Ayumu Narumi's older brother Kiyotaka, a famous detective and pianist, mysteriously disappears without a trace. Ayumu's only clue as to his brother's whereabouts is the phrase "Blade Children," the only words Ayumu could make out in Kiyotaka's final phone call. Now in his freshman year of high school, Ayumu becomes involved in solving a series of murders, crimes, and other incidents, all related to the Blade Children. Together with his school's journalist, Hiyono Yuizaki, and the unwilling assistance of his sister-in-law, Madoka, Ayumu tries to figure out who the Blade Children are and what are their goals.

The Blade Children are the central mystery of the series, known only as cursed children that few know about and are being pursued by so-called Hunters. They are distinguished by their cat-like eyes (though a few lack this feature) and by missing the seventh right rib bone. As Ayumu investigates them, he meets five Blade Children Kousuke Asazuki, Rio Takeuchi, Eyes Rutherford, Ryoko Takamachi, and Kanone Hilbert, and is tested in various ways by them. Those who meet him eventually conclude, some more reluctantly than others, that Ayumu does have what it takes to "save" the Blade Children, as they say Kiyotaka claims.

The anime series, which adapts the story through the sixth volume of the manga, compares the Blade Children to cuckoo birds, having been deposited in human "nests" to be raised, and suggesting that cuckoos go violently crazy toward the end of their lives. The manga continues the story, depicting Ayumu's discoveries about the origin of the Blade Children, their relationship with Kiyotaka, and why his older brother thinks Ayumu might be their savior.

Some thirty years ago, a man called Yaiba Mizushiro was born with one rib missing from his right ribcage. Like Kiyotaka, he excelled at everything he chose to put his mind to. When he turned twenty-three, Yaiba started his own secret society, which swiftly grew powerful enough to manipulate world events. Citing boredom, Yaiba initiated the "Blade Children Project": using in vitro techniques and his DNA, he created eighty children, and had a rib removed from each of them at birth as a mark of their relationship to Yaiba. These Blade Children were cursed in the same way Yaiba was: they would grow up as geniuses in their own right, but one day their blood would awaken murderously and take over their self-will, becoming Avatars of Yaiba. Yaiba's organization split into three parties over the Blade Children Project:
 The Savers supported Yaiba's goals and desire to create more Blade Children. With Yaiba's death, they sought to protect the fact the future had not been determined yet.
 The Watchers were neutral, wanting to observe the first batch of Children and gather results first.
 The Hunters were against Yaiba, and tried multiple times to assassinate him, but repeatedly failed. After Yaiba's death, they worked to eliminate the Blade Children because of their potentially dangerous natures.

When Yaiba was thirty-six, a Japanese man came out of nowhere and easily killed him: Kiyotaka Narumi, Yaiba's counterpart—if Yaiba had been a destroyer, Kiyotaka was a creator. Yaiba had intended to remake the world literally in his own image; with his death, the Blade Children project was halted. Kiyotaka had his hands full trying to stop the Hunters from killing the Blade Children, while trying to check the Savers at the same time.

Just as Kiyotaka and Yaiba were linked, Ayumu eventually meets his own counterpart: Hizumi Mizushiro, Yaiba's younger brother, and the one who will awaken the blood of the remaining Blade Children.  As Ayumu learns of this and becomes friends with Hizumi, he comes to accept that his own powers are as strong as Kiyotaka's and his role as the savior of the Blade Children, leading to a final confrontation.

Spiral: Alive
Spiral: Alive is centered on a girl, Imari Sekiguchi, who falls in love with Shirou Sawamura, a boy who wants to become a detective. However, before Imari can confess to him, he unexpectedly quits school to pursue Kiyotaka Narumi. Imari learns that he also is dating Yukine Amanae, a beautiful girl at their school, and both Shirou and Imari are unaware that Yukine is actually a reluctant murderer. Meanwhile, Toru Saiki, a member of the Police Department's First Investigations Department, investigates the mysterious murders connected with Amanae and is unwilling to bring in Kiyotaka, believing that Tokyo's greatest detective is more demonic than divine. Imari, Shirou, and Saiki become involved in events that are mysteriously connected to the Blade Children. Several characters from the original series return, including Kiyotaka, Kousuke, Ryoko, Kanone, and Madoka.

The series reveals that of the eighty original Blade Children watched by the Hunters, Savers, and Watchers, thirteen have been completely erased from their lists of Blade Children. The one responsible for this had been a neutral party who committed suicide after accomplishing this. The only information about the thirteen missing Blade Children is contained in the Mikanagi File, named after Professor Isabel Mikanagi, who was responsible for their disappearance. With Professor Mikanagi's death, the file was entrusted to her associates, Yukine's parents. After their deaths as the result of a Hunter's actions, Yukine survived and currently holds in her memory the only record of the Mikanagi File.

Main characters

 
 The protagonist of Spiral, Ayumu is very intelligent, but is very introverted and has a lot of self-doubt. He fears that he cannot surpass his own perfect older brother and doubts himself to the point where he no longer believes he can do anything anymore without acting like his brother. He is a talented pianist like Kiyotaka, an excellent cook, and cares a lot for his sister-in-law Madoka. He had an affection toward Madoka, but stopped when Kiyotaka married Madoka. It also said as a fact, from Kiyotaka, that Hiyono was his most important person. Ayumu is also the supposed only hope for the Blade Children and their survival. 
 
 The infamous school journalist, Hiyono is the bubbly and energetic sidekick of Ayumu, always stuck to his side. Very clever and a quick-thinker, her confidence borders dangerously on overconfidence. She is extroverted and is Ayumu's polar opposite, serving as one of the series' few comic-relief characters. Her skill with computers are as amazing as her hacking abilities and she has access to over one hundred resources. She blackmails Wataya often, and is very fond of Ayumu's cooking. Hiyono is also one of the few who whole-heartedly believe in Ayumu; she also has a great deal of faith, feelings, and loyalty in him that carries on for the whole series. She attends Tsukiomi High School alongside Ayumu Narumi. Later on, she is revealed to actually be a spy set out by Kiyotaka to befriend Narumi and help him out. She has also lied about her age, she is actually older than what she has said. 
 
 The 17-year-old world-class pianist, and he is second only to Kiyotaka Narumi, Ayumu Narumi's older brother. He is one of the Blade Children, Eyes is a quarter English and debuted in the musical world at the age of 14. He cares a great deal about the Blade Children and would do anything for them to survive at all costs. He is exceedingly loyal to Kiyotaka's words and seems to believe in Ayumu the most because after all, he is the clone of Kiyotaka Narumi. Eyes knows much more than the other Blade Children do, holding secrets he keeps to himself. 
 
 A Blade Child with a dual personality. He could be cute and friendly or manipulative and insane. He was very close to Eyes. He would cry for Eyes when Eyes could not when they were young, but their friendship fell apart as they grew older and developed vastly different opinions on the fate of the Blade Children. Kanone will go as far as he can to kill the people who give the Blade Children false hope, to prove to Eyes and the Blade Children they have no hope. Kanone is even willing to work with the Hunters to prove to the Blade Children that they have no hope. He does not believe that the Blade Children can be saved from their fates. Later on in the manga he regains his sanity and believes that Ayumu can save the Blade Children from a horrible fate. Just when he finally believes they can all be saved Hizumi kills him, he tells Ayumu to use his death as an opportunity. He also is an expert in fighting, he taught all the introduced Blade Children how to fight. 
 
 He only appears in the manga; and is the 'younger brother' of Yaiba Mizushiro. Hizumi is the complete opposite of Ayumu in many ways. He is sinister and manipulative, though he and Ayumu got along very well upon their initial meeting. Supposedly he is a very dangerous adversary for Ayumu. He has a personality similar to that of Kanone. He is energetic and has an innocent nature about him. He always smiles and is usually well liked by people unrelated to the Blade Children, but that is actually a cover-up for his true personality; he is a desperate and lonely child who knows only despair.

Media

Manga
Spiral: The Bonds of Reasoning was serialized by Enix in Monthly Shōnen Gangan magazine from 1999 to 2005, and collected in 15 tankōbon. The manga was licensed in North America in 2005 by Tokyopop, with the first volume initially scheduled for release October 2005. The series was never published and Tokyopop dropped the license. The license was later acquired by Yen Press in 2007. Yen Press released the first volume in October 2007, and as of August 2008 plans to release the remaining volumes quarterly, with the final volume in April 2011.

Spiral: Alive, a prequel and spin off of the original series, also written by Shirodaira and illustrated by Mizuno, began publishing in the May 2001 issue of Gangan Wing. In 2006, the series moved to Monthly Shōnen Gangan, where it ended in June 2008. It has been collected in five bound volumes.

Volume list

Spiral: The Bonds of Reasoning

Spiral: Alive

Anime
Spiral: The Bonds of Reasoning was adapted as a 25-episode anime television series by TV Tokyo with production by J.C.Staff. It adapts the first six volumes of the manga, with a different ending. It was directed by Shingo Kaneko with music by Akira Mitake and character designs by Yumi Nakayama. The series was broadcast from October 1, 2002 to March 25, 2003, and released on nine DVDs between December 18, 2002 and August 27, 2003.

The opening theme was "Kibouhou" ("Cape of Hope") by Strawberry Jam, and the ending theme was "Kakuteru" ("Cocktail") by Hysteric Blue. There was also an insert song, "Twinkle My Heart" by Mitake Akira, which is sung by the character Hiyono Yuizaki. Piano music used during the series includes Jeux d’eau by Maurice Ravel (episode 3), Liebestraume No. 3 by Franz Liszt (played in concert by Eyes Rutherford in episode 13), Benediction de Dieu dans la solitude by Liszt (episode 21; in the manga, this is a significant piece of music for Eyes and Kanone Hilbert), and Arabesque No. 1 by Claude Debussy (episode 25). A soundtrack album was released March 19, 2003.

The series is licensed in Region 1 by Funimation, which has released it on six DVDs and as a box set. Funimation also aired the series, in dubbed format, in the Funimation Channel programming block on CoLours TV from June 19, 2006 until August 22, 2006.

Reception

The anime adaptation has been praised for its creation of suspense and good mystery stories. The manga got mixed reviews; some stating the blatant display of sex to be overwhelming. The anime however has gone on to much success.

References

External links
 
 Spiral at Yen Press
 Spiral at Funimation
 Spiral at Aniplex 

1999 manga
2002 anime television series debuts
2002 manga
Aniplex
Funimation
Gangan Comics manga
J.C.Staff
Shōnen manga
Square Enix franchises
Tokyopop titles
TV Tokyo original programming
Yen Press titles